The 21st AVN Awards ceremony, presented by Adult Video News (AVN), took place January 10, 2004 at the Venetian Hotel Grand Ballroom, at Paradise, Nevada, U.S.A. During the ceremony, AVN presented AVN Awards in 94 categories honoring the best pornographic films released between Oct. 1, 2002 and Sept. 30, 2003. The ceremony, televised in the United States by Playboy TV, was produced and directed by Gary Miller. Comedian Jim Norton hosted the show for the first time with adult film star Jenna Jameson in her third stint as co-host.

Heart of Darkness won five awards including Best Director—Film for Paul Thomas and Best Film, however, Space Nuts took home the most awards, with six. Other multiple winners included Rawhide, with five awards; Beautiful and Hard Edge with four wins apiece and Fetish: The Dream Scape and Looking In with three each.

Winners and nominees
The nominees for the 21st AVN Awards were announced on December 1, 2003. Rawhide received the most nominations with 15, followed by Heart of Darkness with 14, Space Nuts and Compulsion each with 13 and Beautiful with 12.

The winners were announced during the awards ceremony on January 10, 2004. Space Nuts, a shot-on-video feature with six wins, became one of the rare movies that didn't win a best picture category; those having been won by Heart of Darkness (Best Film), Rawhide and Beautiful tying for Best Video Feature and The Fashionistas capturing Best DVD. The tie of Rawhide and Beautiful for Best Video Feature was a first for that category. AVN's voting procedure in the event of a tie is "Those voters on the AVN full-time staff who did no vote for either of the videos during the original balloting must revote." But even after that step a tie still existed, so AVN senior management decided to let the result stand.

Major awards

Winners are listed first, highlighted in boldface, and indicated with a double dagger.

Additional Award Winners 
These awards were announced, but not presented, in two pre-recorded winners-only segments during the event. Trophies were given to the recipients off-stage:

 Best All-Girl Feature: Babes Illustrated 13
 Best All-Girl Series: No Man's Land
 Best All-Girl Sex Scene—Film: Dru Berrymore, Teanna Kai, Snakeskin
 Best All-Sex DVD: Flesh Hunter 4
 Best All-Sex Film: Hard Edge
 Best All-Sex Video: Fetish: The Dream Scape
 Best Alternative Video: Interviewing Jenna
 Best Amateur Series: Homegrown Video
 Best Amateur Tape: NYC Underground: Manhattan Girls
 Best Anal Sex Scene—Video: Gisselle, Katsumi, Michael Stefano, Multiple P.O.V.
 Best Anal-Themed Feature: Ass Worship 4
 Best Anal-Themed Series: Ass Worship
 Best Art Direction—Film: Andrew Blake, Hard Edge
 Best Art Direction—Video: Laurent Sky, Fetish: The Dream Scape
 Best Cinematography: Andrew Blake, Hard Edge
 Best Classic DVD: Insatiable, i-candy Entertainment
 Best Continuing Video Series: Girlvert
 Best Director, Non-Feature: Laurent Sky, Fetish: The Dream Scape
 Best Director, Foreign Release: Gazzman, The Scottish Loveknot
 Best DVD Extras: Space Nuts
 Best DVD Menus: Space Nuts
 Best DVD Packaging: Rawhide
 Best Editing—Film: Andrew Blake, Hard Edge
 Best Editing—Video: Alexander Craig, Antonio Passolini New Wave Hookers 7
 Best Ethnic-Themed Series: Chasin' the Big Ones
 Best Ethnic-Themed Video—Asian: Asia Noir 2
 Best Ethnic-Themed Video—Latin: Spanish Fly Pussy Search
 Best Foot Fetish Release: Barefoot Confidential 25
 Best Foreign All-Sex Release: Euroglam: Nikki Blonde
 Best Foreign All-Sex Series: Euroglam
 Best Foreign Feature: The Scottish Loveknot
 Best Gonzo Series: Service Animals
 Best Group Sex Scene—Film: Dru Berrymore, AnneMarie, Taylor St. Claire, Savanna Samson, Dale DaBone, Mickey G., Steven St. Croix, Looking In
 Best Group Sex Scene—Video: Ashley Long, Julie Night, Nacho Vidal, Manuel Ferrera, Back 2 Evil 
 Best High-Definition Production: Rawhide
 Best Interactive DVD: My Plaything: Jenna Jameson 2
 Best Male Newcomer: Ben English
 Best Marketing Website: EvilAngel.com
 Best Music: Doug Scott, Allen Rene, Opera
 Best Non-Sex Performance: Allen Rene, Opera
 Best Oral-Themed Feature: Feeding Frenzy 2
 Best Oral-Themed Series: Gag Factor
 Best Overall Marketing Campaign—Company Image: Vivid Entertainment Group
 Best Overall Marketing Campaign—Individual Project: Mary Carey Campaign, Kick Ass Pictures
 Best Pro-Am Release: Breakin Em In 5
 Best Pro-Am Series: Breakin Em In
 Best Retail Website: AdultDVDEmpire.com
 Best Screenplay—Film: Axel Braun, Compulsion
 Best Screenplay—Video: George Kaplan, Michael Raven, Beautiful
 Best Sex Scene in a Foreign-Shot Production: Katsumi, Steve Holmes, Katsumi's Affair
 Best Solo Sex Scene: Brooke Ballentyne, Screaming Orgasms 11
 Best Special Effects: Dick Roundtree, Chokko Calisto, MV Effects, Space Nuts
 Best Specialty Big Bust Release: Heavy Handfuls 2
 Best Specialty BD & SM Release: Debbie Does Fem-Dom 3
 Best Specialty Release—Other Genre: Chunky on the Fourth of July
 Best Specialty Spanking Release: Spanked Toilet Whores
 Best Supporting Actor—Video: Randy Spears, Space Nuts
 Best Supporting Actress—Video: Brooke Ballentyne, Rawhide
 Best Tease Performance: Michelle Wild, Crack Her Jack
 Best Transsexual Release: She-Male Domination Nation
 Best VHS Box Cover Concept: Angel X, Wicked Pictures
 Best VHS Packaging: Euroglam: Wanda Curtis, Ninn Worx/Pure Play
 Best Videography: Nicholas Steele, Rawhide
 Best Vignette Tape: Mason's Dirty Trixxx 2
 Best Vignette Series: Barely Legal
 Female Foreign Performer of the Year: Mandy Bright
 Male Foreign Performer of the Year: Manuel Ferrera
 Most Outrageous Sex Scene: Julie Night, Maggie Star, Mr. Pete in "Love in an Abbatoir," Perverted Stories The Movie
 Transsexual Performer of the Year: Vaniity

Honorary AVN Awards

Reuben Sturman Award
 None given this year

Hall of Fame
AVN Hall of Fame inductees for 2004 were: Julia Ann, Brad Armstrong, Kim Christy, Don Fernando, Max Hardcore, Houston, Johnny Keyes, Jim Malibu, Rhonda Jo Petty, Alicia Rio, Misty Rain, Barry Wood

Multiple nominations and awards

The following releases received the most nominations.

 The following 17 releases received multiple awards:

Presenters and performers
The following individuals, listed in order of appearance, presented awards or performed musical numbers or comedy.

Presenters  (in order of appearance)

Performers

Ceremony information 

AVN created five new categories for the 2004 awards show: Best Amateur Tape, Best Amateur Series, Best Marketing Website — Production Company, Best Retail Website and Best Transsexual Performer.

A few years earlier, AVN had changed its Best Amateur Tape and Best Amateur Series Awards categories to Best Pro-Am or Amateur Tape and Best Pro-Am or Amateur Series. Amateur productions and pro-am productions now will be split into separate categories with professionals shooting or performing in the pro-am categories but not the strictly amateur categories. The Best Marketing Website — Production Company category is for free websites "strictly devoted to marketing adult product," and the Best Retail Website category is for non-pay sites selling adult products. Best Transsexual Performer was created because until now, the only award recognizing the transsexual genre was the Best Transsexual Tape, which recognized directors more than performers.

Besides being recorded for March broadcast on Playboy TV, a DVD of the awards show was also issued by Hustler.

Performance of year's movies

Hustlaz: Diary of a Pimp was announced as the adult movie industry's top selling movie and The Fashionistas was the top renting movie of the previous year.

Critical reviews

High Society magazine viewed the show and its surrounding AVN Adult Entertainment Expo favourably: "AEE, and the accompanying AVN Awards, is a hell of a lot of fun, but we're kind of glad it only happens once a year. That many breast implants, tattoos, piercings and diva-like attitudes in one buiilding, at one time, is a little much, even for us."

See also

 AVN Award
 AVN Best New Starlet Award
 AVN Award for Male Performer of the Year
 AVN Award for Male Foreign Performer of the Year
 AVN Female Performer of the Year Award
 List of members of the AVN Hall of Fame
 2004 GayVN Awards

Notes

References

External links

 
2004 AVN Award nominees (archived at Wayback Machine, December 3, 2003)
 2004 AVN Award Winners (archived at Wayback Machine, April 1, 2004)
 Adult Video News Awards  at the Internet Movie Database
 
 
 

AVN Awards
2003 film awards